Villafranca is a habitational surname of Spanish and Italian origin.

Notable people
Notable people with this surname include:
 Fernando Villafranca (born 1993), Mexican boxer
 Juan de Villafranca (born 1954), Mexican diplomat
 Vincent Villafranca (born 1969), American sculptor

See also
 Villafranca (disambiguation)